Bodalkasa Dam, is an earthfill dam on Bhagdeogoti river near Tiroda, Gondia district in State of Maharashtra in India.

Specifications

Purpose
 Irrigation

Tourism
Bodalkasa has become a popular tourist Hotspot. It is also having maharashtra government resthouse.

See also
 Dams in Maharashtra
 List of reservoirs and dams in India

References

Dams in Gondia district
Dams completed in 1917
1917 establishments in India